Saint Joseph's Church is a church situated on the / in the Leopold Quarter of Brussels, Belgium. Built between 1842 and 1849 in eclectic style, it is a national sanctuary dedicated to Saint Joseph, who has been the patron saint of Belgium since 1679.

History
Inspired by the church of Trinità dei Monti in Rome, the architect Tilman-François Suys decided to create a church resembling one of Rome's many basilicas with a flat apse choir. The first stone of the building was laid by Cardinal Engelbert Sterckx on 6 April 1842. The Apostolic Nuncio, Cardinal Giacomo Cattani, consecrated the church on 24 June 1874 and also made it the National Shrine of Saint Joseph.

The church was occupied by the Redemptorists for many decades until it was looked after by the Syriac Orthodox from 1989 to 2001. It was then acquired by the Priory of Christ the King of the Society of St. Pius X, offering a much needed place of worship for their growing number of parishioners.

The building received protected status through a royal decree issued on 13 May 1981.

Description

See also

 List of churches in Brussels
 Roman Catholicism in Belgium
 History of Brussels
 Belgium in "the long nineteenth century"

References

External links
 Official site of the Society of Saint Pius X Belgium

Roman Catholic churches in Brussels
City of Brussels
Protected heritage sites in Brussels
19th-century Roman Catholic church buildings in Belgium
Roman Catholic churches completed in 1849
Buildings and structures of the Society of Saint Pius X